Andreas Pachipis (born 16 December 1994) is a Cypriot footballer who plays as a defender or midfielder for Karmiotissa.

Career

As a youth player, Pachipis joined the youth academy of English second division side Blackpool.

In 2014, he signed for Vestri in the Icelandic second division, before joining English sixth division club Hyde United.

In 2015, Pachipis signed for Aris Limassol in the Cypriot top flight, where he made 52 league appearances and scored 0 goals.

In 2018, he signed for Cypriot team Doxa.

In 2019, Pachipis signed for Olympiakos in Cyprus.

References

External links

 

Cypriot footballers
Association football midfielders
Association football defenders
Living people
Expatriate footballers in Iceland
Cypriot expatriate sportspeople in Iceland
Cypriot expatriate sportspeople in England
Cypriot First Division players
1994 births
Hyde United F.C. players
Vestri (football club) players
1. deild karla players
Olympiakos Nicosia players
Aris Limassol FC players
Doxa Katokopias FC players
Karmiotissa FC players
Cypriot expatriate footballers
Expatriate footballers in England